The 2015–16 season was the 47th season in the existence of Paris FC and the club's first season back in the second division of French football since 1982. In addition to the domestic league, Paris FC participated in this season's editions of the Coupe de France and the Coupe de la Ligue.

Players

First-team squad

Out on loan

Pre-season and friendlies

Competitions

Overall record

Ligue 2

League table

Results summary

Results by round

Matches

Coupe de France

Coupe de la Ligue

References

Paris FC seasons
Paris